Onoda may refer to:

People with the surname 
 Chiyotaro Onoda (1896–1944), Go player
 Hiroo Onoda (1922–2014), Japanese soldier stationed in the Philippines during World War II who refused to surrender until 1974
 Kazuo Onoda (1900–1983), Japanese swimmer
, Japanese footballer
 Minoru Onoda (1937 - 2008), Japanese artist, member of Gutai Group
, Japanese bobsledder
 Yoshiki Onoda (born 1925), Japanese film director and writer

Places 
 Onoda Line, a railway line in Yamaguchi Prefecture, Japan
 Onoda Station, a railway station in Sanyo-Onoda, Yamaguchi Prefecture, Japan
 Onoda, Yamaguchi, a city in Yamaguchi Prefecture, Japan
 Onoda, Miyagi, a former town located in Miyagi Prefecture, Japan. It became a part of Kami, Miyagi in 2003.

Other uses
 Onoda: 10,000 Nights in the Jungle, 2021 film

Japanese-language surnames